Laurence Irwin Barrett (born September 6, 1935) is an American journalist and author associated with Time, for whom he worked from 1965 until his retirement in 1993.

Background and personal life
Barrett graduated from New York University (1956) and the Columbia University Graduate School of Journalism (1957). He married Martha Patterson in 1988, his previous marriage having ended in divorce.
 His first marriage of 25 years was to Paulette Singer Barrett.

Career
Barrett joined the New York Herald-Tribune in  1957 and covered New York City Hall issues for the paper from 1959 to 1962 before becoming its Washington correspondent. He published The Mayor of New York, a novel, in 1965.

Barrett joined Time in 1965, and, after being a senior editor for six years, returned to reporting in early 1975 as head of its New York office. He was Time'''s White House correspondent from 1981 to 1985, and then its national political correspondent, before becoming deputy Washington bureau chief. He returned to the position of national political correspondent in mid-1991. Barrett retired from Time in 1993.

In 1983 Barrett published Gambling with History: Reagan in the White House, based on "unusual access to internal deliberations" for a period of two years. Revelations included Richard Darman's successful attempt to stall the invocation of Section 4 of the Twenty-fifth Amendment to the United States Constitution when President Reagan was receiving treatment following the 1981 assassination attempt on him. The book also revealed what became known as "Debategate" - the theft of papers by the Reagan campaign from the Carter campaign during the 1980 presidential election.

Retirement
After his retirement in 1993, Barrett became vice president of a Washington public relations firm,New York Times, August 22, 1999, WEDDINGS; Julie Cohen, Paul M. Barrett and a member of the Advisory Board of the Washington Center for Politics & Journalism.

 Books 
 The Mayor of New York, Doubleday, 1965
 Gambling with History: Reagan in the White House'', Doubleday, 1983

References

External links 
 Appearances on C-SPAN

1935 births
Living people
American political writers
American male non-fiction writers
American political journalists
Time (magazine) people
New York Herald Tribune people